Kabud Mehr (also Romanized as Kabūd Mehr; also known as Kūrāmār) is a village in Kuhestani-ye Talesh Rural District, in the Central District of Talesh County, Gilan Province, Iran. At the 2006 census, its population was 51, in 13 families.

Language 
Linguistic composition of the village.

References 

Tageo

Populated places in Talesh County

Azerbaijani settlements in Gilan Province